Andrew Schneider (born July 31, 1981) is an American former professional ice hockey defenseman who played in the American Hockey League (AHL), ECHL, and German Deutsche Eishockey Liga (DEL). He has been an assistant coach for the Lincoln Stars and the Swift Current Broncos.

Playing career 
He joined on January 28, 2009, from Toronto Marlies of the American Hockey League to Adler Mannheim.

Drafted in 2001 by the Pittsburgh Penguins, he was a 5th round pick (156th overall).

Since drafted, he has yet to appear in an NHL hockey game, playing US College hockey after being drafted, and joining the AHL Portland Pirates for the 2007–08 season.

Awards and honors

Career statistics

References

External links

1981 births
Adler Mannheim players
American men's ice hockey defensemen
Iserlohn Roosters players
Lincoln Stars players
Living people
Sportspeople from Grand Forks, North Dakota
Portland Pirates players
Pittsburgh Penguins draft picks
Toronto Marlies players
North Dakota Fighting Hawks men's ice hockey players
Wheeling Nailers players
Wilkes-Barre/Scranton Penguins players